La Soledad is a 2016 drama film and the directorial debut of Venezuelan filmmaker Jorge Thielen Armand. It premiered in the 73rd Venice International Film Festival. The production received the financial support of The Venice Biennale College and it is a co-production between Venezuela, Canada and Italy.

Plot 
The inspiration for filming La Soledad emerged from the childhood memories and experiences of the director in the family house of his grandparents, in the city of Caracas, Venezuela. After living years abroad, he came back to the country to shoot in that same house a film that sways between documentary and fiction.

The house, which is itself a character, has been practically abandoned by his family and is about to collapse. It is now the home of new occupants: Rosina, who was formerly an employee of the owners, and her grandson José. The "proprietors" decide to demolish it and "the squatters" must seek a new place to live in. The film portrays core issues of contemporary Venezuelan society.

Cast 

 José Dolores López
 Adrializ López
 Jorge Roque Thielen H.
 Marley Alvillares
 María del Carmen Agámez

Reception 
Glenn Kenny of RogerEbert.com wrote that La Soledad was "poetic and ultimately devastating". Leslie Felperin of The Guardian expressed: "This promising debut feature opens up gradually, like a fragrant but potentially poisonous night-blooming flower".

Additionally, it received the Honorable Mention at the 4th edition of La Casa Cine Fest and at the 48th edition of the Nashville Film Festival.

Awards and nominations

References

External links 
 
 La Soledad at FilmAffinity
 La Soledad at Vimeo

2016 films
2016 drama films